Lucius Licinius Sura was an influential Roman Senator from Tarraco, Hispania, a close friend of the Emperor Trajan and three times consul, in a period when three consulates were very rare for non-members of the Imperial family. The dates of two of these consulates are certain: in 102 and 107 AD he was consul ordinarius; the date of his first consulate, as a suffect consul has been debated. Fausto Zevi postulated that he was also suffect consul in 97, based on a plausible restoration of part of the Fasti Ostienses, which reads "..]us". However, two more recently recovered fragments of military diplomas show that the name of this consul is L. Pomponius Maternus, who is otherwise unknown. Most authorities have returned to endorsing C.P. Jones' surmise that Sura was consul for the first time in the year 93. He was a correspondent of Pliny the Younger.

Life 
He was mentioned by a number of contemporary writers, who provide hints about his personality. The earliest mention of Sura are in three of Martial's epigrams. In the first (I.49), addressed to Licinianus of Bilbilis in 85/86, Sura is described as wealthy. The second (VI.64) is published in 89/90, wherein Martial defends his trifles against criticism by appealing to the highest authorities, who include, besides Sura, Silius Italicus, consul in 68, Marcus Aquilius Regulus, and the emperor himself. The third, dated to the year 92, congratulates Sura on recovering from a serious illness (VII.47); Ronald Syme speculates that Sura was one of the victims of an epidemic that followed one of the Dacian Wars. Arrian, in his Life of Epictetus, has the title character refer to a rich catamite belonging to Sura. A third writer is Pliny the Younger, who addressed two letters to Sura on scientific matters.

Licinius Sura was a close and trusted companion of the emperor Trajan, and Cassius Dio tells how Trajan proved his fidelity: one day, without prior notice, he went to Sura's house; then, after dismissing his bodyguard, Trajan bathed, had Sura shave him, and dined with him. The following day he said to those who had disparaged Sura: "If Sura had desired to kill me, he would have killed me yesterday." How Sura came to be a trusted companion is unclear. Edmund Groag surmised that it was Sura who suggested Trajan's name as an heir to the emperor Nerva after the latter was confronted by a mutiny by the Praetorian Guard. However, this view has been challenged: when discussing the details of Nerva's choice of Trajan as an heir, John D. Grainger simply omits all mention of Groag's theory. Werner Eck notes that Sura was governor of Germania Inferior from the year 96 to 98; Nerva announced his choice of an heir in October 97.

During the first campaign against the Dacians, after the Second Battle of Tapae, Trajan dispatched Sura and Tiberius Claudius Livianus to negotiate peace with the Dacian king Decebalus. Nothing was accomplished, since Decebalus did not meet them, but sent envoys instead on this occasion. Nevertheless, because the Romans captured key strongpoints in the mountains and Decebalus' sister was captured, the Dacians agreed to the terms the Romans demanded and peace was agreed to between the Romans and Dacians. For this, Sura was appointed to a second consulate as consul ordinarius in 102 as the colleague of Lucius Julius Ursus Servianus. He also participated in Trajan's second campaign against the Dacians; while his role in that war is undetermined, it was important enough for Sura to be awarded triumphal ornaments and a third consulate in 107 with Quintus Sosius Senecio as his colleague.

Sura vanishes from the public record after his third consulate; Syme believes he died in 108. According to Cassius Dio, Trajan gave him a public funeral and had a statue erected in Sura's memory.

See also 
 Licinia gens
 Baths of Licinius Sura

References 

Licinius Sura
Roman governors of Germania Inferior
Sura, Lucius
Romans from Hispania
1st-century Romans
2nd-century Romans
1st-century births
2nd-century deaths